Bega may refer to:

People
 Saint Bega
 Bega (surname)

Places
 Bega, New South Wales, a town in New South Wales, Australia
 Bega Valley Shire, a coastal local government area in New South Wales
 Electoral district of Bega, a New South Wales electoral district
 Bega, alternate name for Beica, a town in southwestern Ethiopia
 Bega (Dörentrup), a small village next to Dörentrup in Lippe district, Germany

Rivers:
 Bega River (New South Wales), a river in Australia
 Bega (Werre), a river in Germany
 Bega (Tisza), also Begej, a river in Romania and Serbia
 Bega Luncanilor, a headwater of the Bega in Romania
 Bega Poienilor, another headwater of the Bega in Romania
 Bega Veche, a tributary of the Bega in Romania

Other uses
 Bega Canal, in Romania and Serbia
 Bega Group, an Australian cheese manufacturer
 Bega Group (Romania), a Romanian company 
 BEGA League, a group of characters in the anime/manga Beyblade
 Bega Valley Rally, a car rally centred in Bega, New South Wales